The Lost City of Z is the name given by Col. Percy Harrison Fawcett, a British surveyor, to an indigenous city that he believed had existed in the jungle of the Mato Grosso state of Brazil. Based on early histories of South America and his own explorations of the Amazon River region, Fawcett theorized that a complex civilization once existed there, and that isolated ruins may have survived.

History

Fawcett found a document known as Manuscript 512, held at the National Library of Brazil, believed to have been written by Portuguese bandeirante João da Silva Guimarães. According to the document, in 1753, a group of bandeirantes discovered the ruins of an ancient city that contained arches, a statue and a temple with hieroglyphs. He described the city ruins in great detail without giving its location.

Manuscript 512 was written after explorations made in the sertão of the province of Bahia. Fawcett intended to pursue finding this city as a secondary goal after "Z". He was preparing an expedition to find "Z" when World War I broke out and the British government suspended its support. Fawcett returned to Britain and served on the Western Front during the war. In 1920 Fawcett undertook a personal expedition to find the city but withdrew after suffering from fever and having to shoot his pack animal. On a second expedition five years later Fawcett, his son Jack and Jack's friend Raleigh Rimell disappeared in the Mato Grosso jungle.

Researchers believe that Fawcett may have been influenced in his thinking by information obtained from indigenous people about the archaeological site of Kuhikugu, near the headwaters of the Xingu River. After Fawcett's presumed death in the jungle, Kuhikugu was discovered by Westerners in 1925. The site contains the ruins of an estimated twenty towns and villages in which as many as 50,000 people might once have lived. The discovery of other large geometrical earthworks in interfluvial settings of southern Amazonia has since been recognised as supporting Fawcett’s theory.

In popular culture 
In 2005, the American journalist David Grann published an article in The New Yorker on Fawcett's expeditions and findings, titled "The Lost City of Z". In 2009 he developed it into a book of the same title and, in 2016, it was adapted by writer-director James Gray into a film also of the same name starring Charlie Hunnam, Robert Pattinson, Tom Holland and Sienna Miller.

A hunt for "The Lost City of D" forms the plot of the 2022 film The Lost City.

See also
The Lost City of Z (book)
The Lost City of Z (film)
Lost city
Kuhikugu
El Dorado

Notes

References

Sources

Further reading

 (Repr., Northwestern University Press 1999: .)

External links
Manuscript 512, English translation., Fawcett Adventure website
Secrets of the Dead - Lost in the Amazon. PBS video special on Fawcett's quest for the City of Z.

Mythological populated places
Populated places in Mato Grosso
Brazilian mythology
Secret places